Baylor may refer to:


American schools
 Baylor University, Waco, Texas
 Baylor Bears, the sports teams of Baylor University
 Baylor College of Medicine, Houston, Texas
 Texas A&M University Baylor College of Dentistry, Dallas, Texas (Baylor name deleted in 2016)
 Baylor College of Medicine Academy at Ryan, a middle school in Houston, Texas
 Baylor School, a private prep school in Chattanooga, Tennessee

Places in the United States
Baylor, West Virginia, an unincorporated community
Baylor County, Texas, named for Henry Weidner Baylor

People
Baylor (surname), a list of people
 Baylor Scheierman (born 2000), American basketball player

See also